Selenium fluoride may refer to:

 Selenium tetrafluoride (selenium(IV) fluoride), SeF4
 Selenium hexafluoride (selenium(VI) fluoride), SeF6